Kyle A. Rasmussen (born June 20, 1968, in Sonora, California) is a former World Cup alpine ski racer from Angels Camp, California.

While competing with the U.S. Ski Team, he won two World Cup downhills in 1995 (Wengen and Kvitfjell), his best season, in which he finished sixth in the downhill standings, fifth in the Super-G standings, and 17th in the overall standings.

Rasmussen competed in three Winter Olympics in the 1990s and was ninth in the 1998 Downhill. With 12 top-ten finishes in his World Cup career, he retired from competition at age 30 in October 1998.

World Cup results

Season standings

Race podiums
 2 wins – (2 DH)
 3 podiums – (2 DH, 1 SG), 12 top tens

World Championship results

Olympic results

References

External links
 
 Kyle Rasmussen World Cup standings at the International Ski Federation
 
 

American male alpine skiers
Alpine skiers at the 1992 Winter Olympics
Alpine skiers at the 1994 Winter Olympics
Alpine skiers at the 1998 Winter Olympics
Olympic alpine skiers of the United States
Sportspeople from California
1968 births
Living people
People from Sonora, California